P class or Class P may refer to:

Computing 
 P (complexity), a computational complexity class

Ships and yachts
 P-class cruiser, a class of 12 heavy cruisers planned for construction by the Kriegsmarine during the late 1930s, but cancelled before any could be built
 Pelorus-class cruiser, a class of 11 protected cruisers operated by the Royal Navy and Royal Australian Navy from the 1890s to the 1920s
 P-class destroyer, a class of 8 Royal Navy destroyers built during World War II
 P-class sloop, operated by the British navy during World War I
 P-class submarine (disambiguation), a number of submarine classes
 P-class sailing dinghy, a New Zealand sailing dinghy design first created in the 1920s, popularly used for sail training
 P-class yacht (Universal Rule), a development class for America's Cup racing yachts under the Universal Rule

Railway locomotives 
 Two classes of steam locomotives used by the New Zealand Railways Department: 
NZR P class (1876), of 1876
NZR P class (1885), of 1885
 WAGR P Class, a 1924 express steam-locomotive of the Western Australian Government Railways
V/Line P class,  a type of diesel electric locomotive, in service with V/Line and Pacific National in Australia
 SECR P class, a class of locomotives of the South Eastern and Chatham Railway in the UK
DSB class P, a class of steam locomotives of the Danish State Railways
NER Class P, a class of steam locomotives of the North Eastern Railway
 Palestine Railways P class